= Contando a féria =

Sculpture in São Paulo, Brazil

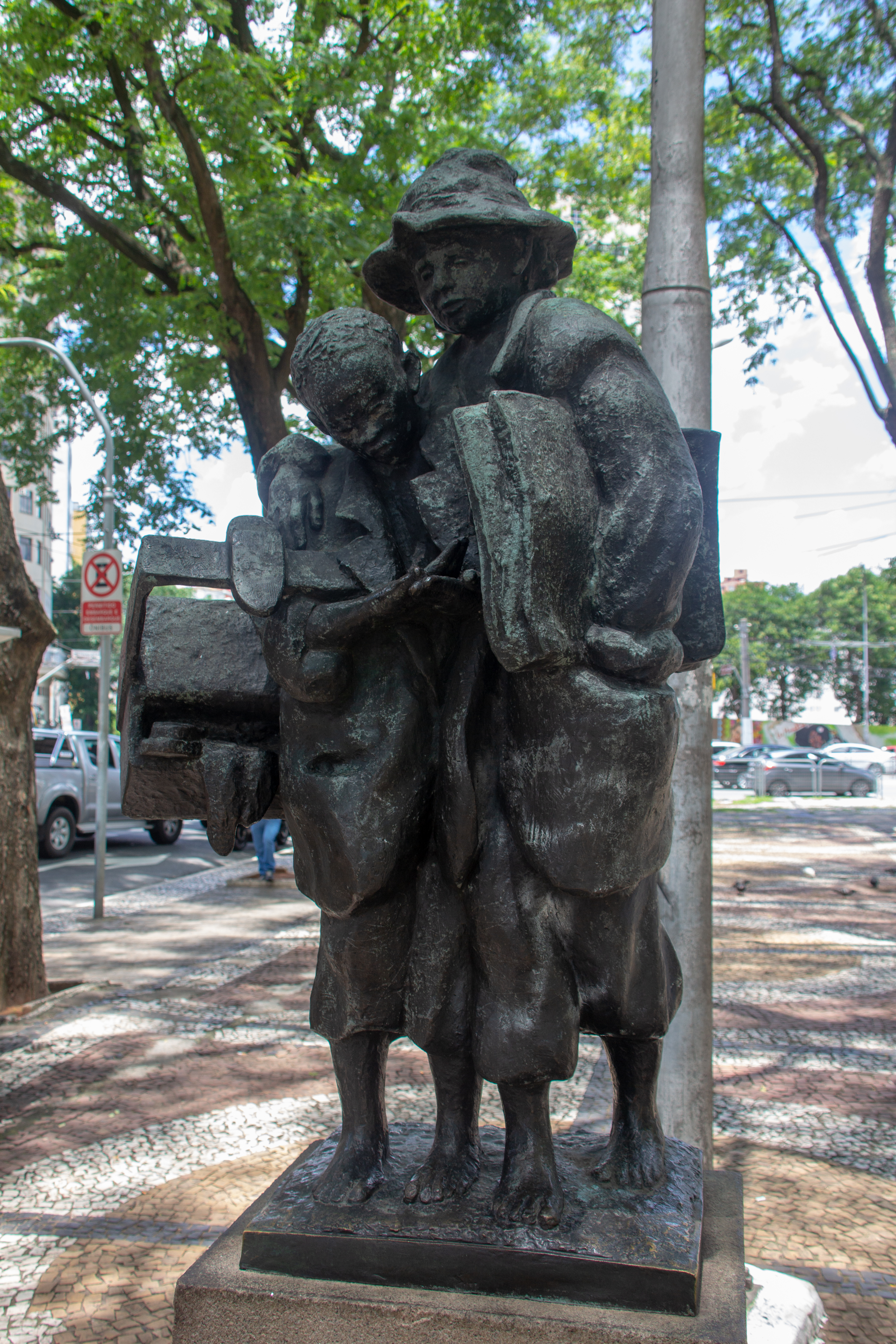

- Location in João Mendes Place, São Paulo, Brazil
- Artist: Ricardo Cipicchia
- Year: 1950
- Medium: bronze (sculpture); granite (base)
- Location: 23°33′07″S 46°38′04″W

Portuguese: Contando a féria or The Shoemaker and the Newsboy (Portuguese: O engraxate e o jornaleiro) is a sculpture located in João Mendes Place in São Paulo, Brazil. It was created by Ricardo Cipicchia and inaugurated in 1950.

The piece was produced in bronze, with a granite pedestal. Bronze work was carried out by the J. Rebeliato Foundry.

It portrays two professions, very common at the start of the 20th century in the Brazilian cities: a shoemaker and a newspaper seller. These were usually activities performed by children and adolescents. Cipicchia carried out the work by observing this work being carried out in the central area of São Paulo. It is part of a series of works done by the sculptor and spread in the city of São Paulo.

The stylistic highlight in the work is the expressiveness of the young people portrayed.

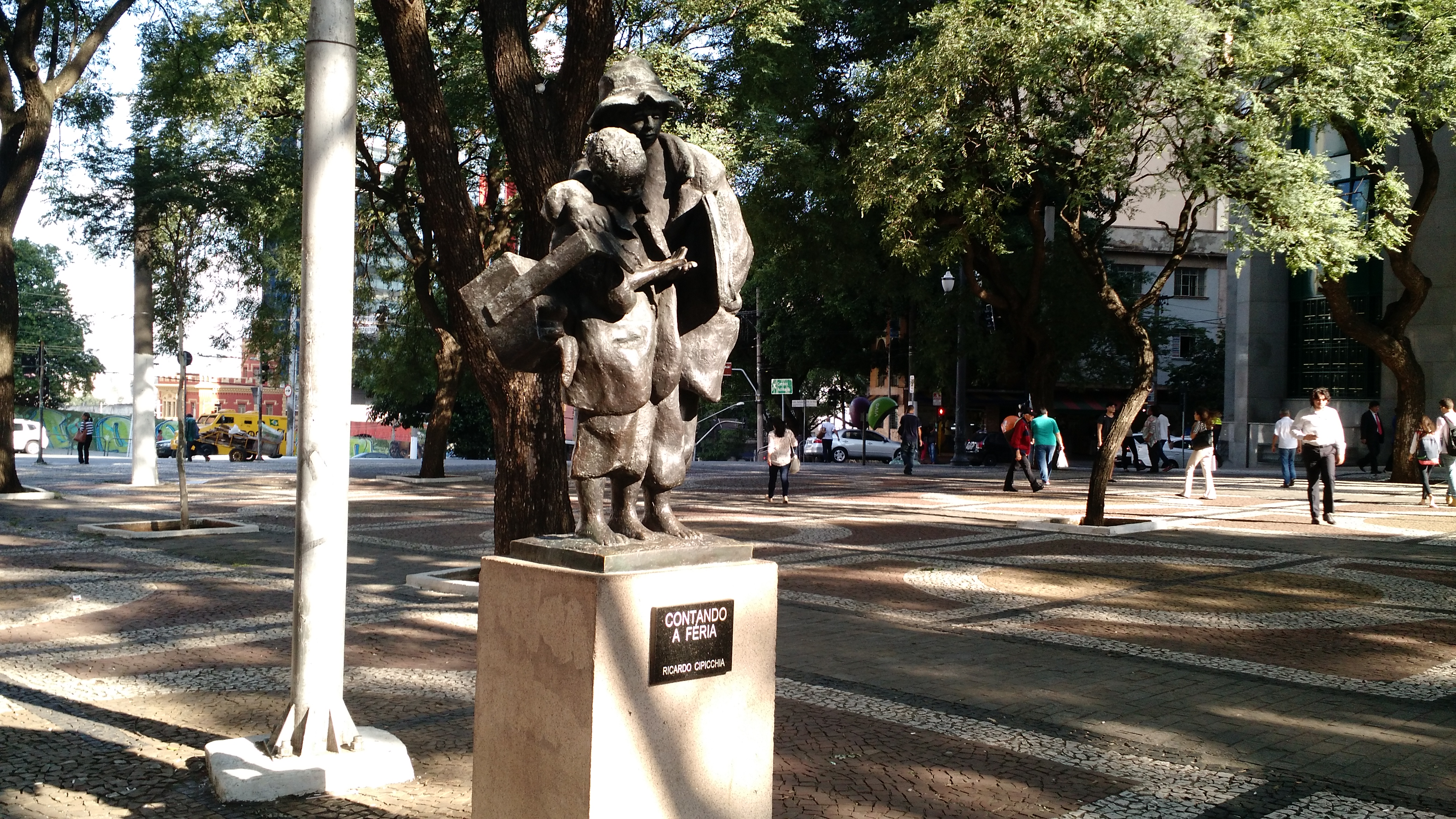
The monument in the park

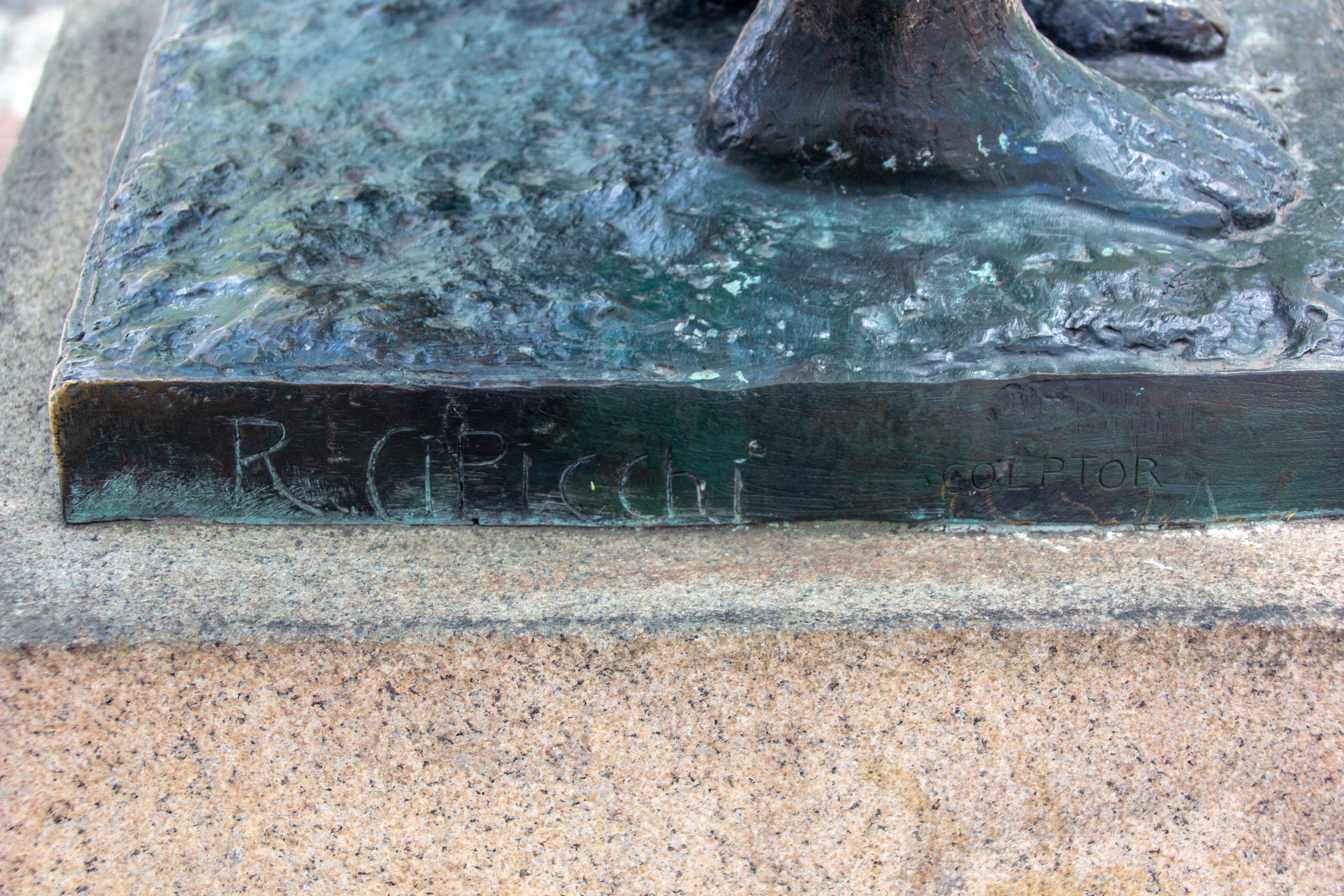
The artist's signature on the statue
